Punta Robalo is a town and corregimiento in Chiriquí Grande District, Bocas del Toro Province, Panama. Its population as of 1990 was 3,118; its population as of 2000 was 1,673. The town is located on the western coast of Chiriquí Lagoon.

References

Corregimientos of Bocas del Toro Province